Ahmad ibn al-Hasan al-Kalbi was the second Kalbid Emir of Sicily. He was the son of the first Kalbid emir, al-Hasan ibn Ali al-Kalbi, who ruled the island on behalf of the Fatimid Caliphate. Ahmad succeeded his father in May 953 until 968, apart from a brief interruption in 958/9. In the 960s, he led the completion of the Muslim conquest of Sicily by capturing the last Byzantine strongholds of Taormina and Rometta and defeating a Byzantine relief expedition. He was recalled to Ifriqiya to participate in the upcoming Fatimid conquest of Egypt, and died there shortly after.

References

Sources
 
 
 
 
 

969 deaths
Year of birth unknown
Admirals of the Fatimid Caliphate
Generals of the Fatimid Caliphate
Kalbids
Fatimid people of the Arab–Byzantine wars
10th-century people from the Fatimid Caliphate
10th-century Arabs

Fatimid governors of Sicily
Emirs of Sicily